Borów  is a village in the administrative district of Gmina Prusice, within Trzebnica County, Lower Silesian Voivodeship, in south-western Poland.

Notable residents
 Heinrich Freiherr von Lüttwitz (1896–1969), Wehrmacht general

References

Villages in Trzebnica County